The Ernest McCarty Oliver House, in LaFayette, Alabama, is a Victorian house built in 1895.  It was listed on the National Register of Historic Places in 1974.

It is a two-story brick house, primarily Victorian in style but influenced by several styles including Eastlake.  It was built from brick derived from clay behind the house and baked in a kiln on site.

It is located on LaFayette St. North (U.S. Route 431 / Alabama State Route 1) in LaFayette.

References

		
National Register of Historic Places in Chambers County, Alabama
Victorian architecture in Alabama
Houses completed in 1895